Lower Lees Farmhouse is a historic building in the English parish of Bowland Forest Low, Lancashire. It is Grade II listed, built in 1678, and is a sandstone farmhouse with a slate roof and a pebbledashed left gable.  There are two storeys and three bays, and outshuts at the rear.  The windows are mullioned, those in the left bay dating from the 19th century and containing sashes.  The doorway has moulded jambs, the moulding continuing to form semicircular arches on the lintel, which is also inscribed.

See also
Listed buildings in Bowland Forest Low

References

Notes

1678 establishments in England
Houses completed in 1678
Grade II listed buildings in Lancashire
Houses in Lancashire
Farmhouses in England
Buildings and structures in Ribble Valley